Farnborough Airport  (previously called: TAG Farnborough Airport, RAE Farnborough, ICAO Code EGLF) is an operational business/executive general aviation airport in Farnborough, Rushmoor, Hampshire, England. The  airport covers about 8% of Rushmoor's land area.

Farnborough Aerodrome has a CAA Ordinary Licence (Number P864) that allows flights for the public transport of passengers or for flying instruction as authorised by the licensee (TAG Farnborough Airport Limited).

The first powered flight in Britain was at Farnborough on 16 October 1908, when Samuel Cody took off in his British Army Aeroplane No 1.

The airfield is the home of the Farnborough Airshow which is held in even numbered years. It is also home to the Air Accidents Investigation Branch (AAIB) and the southern office of Rail Accident Investigation Branch (RAIB), both part of the Department for Transport.

History 
Farnborough Airport has a long history, beginning at the start of the 20th century with the creation of His Majesty's Balloon Factory and the first powered flight in Britain in 1908. This subsequently became the Royal Aircraft Establishment, a connection which continues in the Farnborough Air Sciences Trust museum.

Farnborough airfield and RAE was bombed by Germany during World War II, on 13 August 1940 by a flight of Junkers Ju 88s.

The civil enclave was operated by Farnborough Business Aviation until 2003, when the Ministry of Defence stopped operations at Farnborough. All experimental aircraft were moved to MoD Boscombe Down; the airport was taken over by TAG Aviation. On 27 September 2019 TAG Farnborough Airport Ltd was acquired by Macquarie Infrastructure and Real Assets (Europe) Limited. It changed its name on 10 October 2019 to Farnborough Airport Ltd. Commercial defence research by research firm QinetiQ continues in the adjoining Cody Technology Park.

Farnborough Airfield appeared in the 2008 James Bond film Quantum of Solace, as the Austrian airport from which Bond flies. The airfield was also a location for the 2010 film Inception.

Infrastructure 

After TAG took control of the airport from the MOD, it invested in a series of new infrastructure projects, including a new radar unit and a resurfaced runway. The most striking new constructions were a new control tower, a large hangar unit, and finally a brand new terminal building that opened in 2006, all designed by Reid Architecture and Buro Happold. The designs won a series of awards, and were nominated for Building of the Year by Building magazine in 2007. The terminal was formally opened by Prince Andrew.

Operations 
Activity at the airport has grown from a low level in 1989 to around 30,000 movements in 2018. The airport is home to a number of the UK's largest business jet companies, including Gama Aviation, Executive Jet Charter and Bookajet.

Farnborough Airport sees the bulk of its traffic from conventional business jets. The airport is also popular with operators of larger aircraft, such as the Boeing BBJ and Airbus A319CJ; however, the use of these types is heavily restricted, with nothing larger than a BBJ2 permitted except during the airshow.

The airport's only scheduled services are private and are operated by BAE Systems, whose headquarters are next to the airport: it operates an Embraer 135 on a twice-daily shuttle service to Warton Aerodrome, Monday–Thursday, and a single Embraer 135 shuttle flight to Warton on Fridays. BAE also operates a Beechcraft King Air 200 to Walney Island. This service runs 1–4 times a day Monday–Friday.
Farnborough Airport was the operations base for Citelynx, now defunct.

The Air Accidents Investigation Branch has their head office in Farnborough House, located in a compound within Farnborough Airport. The Rail Accident Investigation Branch has their southern office on the same property, next to AAIB.

Incidents and accidents 
During the Farnborough Airshow on 6 September 1952 the prototype de Havilland DH.110 Sea Vixen crashed. Following a demonstration of its ability to break the sound barrier, the aircraft disintegrated, killing 31 people, including the crew of two: test pilot and record breaker John Derry and Tony Richards. This incident led to major changes to the safety regulations for air shows in the UK.

During the 4 September 1984 show, a de Havilland Canada DHC-5 Buffalo was destroyed when it struck Runway 25 during landing after a steep short-final descent while demonstrating its STOL capabilities to spectators and customers. The nose-gear collapsed, followed by failure of the wing spar on both sides near the fuselage, both propellers shedding blades and the wrecked aircraft skidding to a halt on the runway. The two crew and one passenger survived the crash; nobody else was injured. The accident was attributed to pilot error, with gusty wind conditions as a major factor.

Opposition to airport expansion 

The airport was originally restricted to 28,000 movements each year, of which no more than 2,500 were permitted at weekends. In October 2005, TAG applied to Rushmoor Borough Council to have the weekend limit raised. The application was initially refused, but allowed by the Government on appeal in March 2008 after a Public Inquiry. A further application for an increase in the overall limit to 50,000 movements per annum was refused by Rushmoor Borough Council in 2009 and an appeal against this refusal was heard in May 2010. In February 2011 the joint Secretaries of State decided to uphold the planning appeal and allow 50,000 annual movements, phased in until 2019. The neutrality of the government was questioned by the Green Party of England and Wales after Eric Pickles, local government minister, attended a lobbying dinner where TAG chief executive, Brandon O'Reilly was present.

Opposition to the business airport has been chronicled by Blackwater Environmental Justice, and Farnborough Aerodrome Residents Association (FARA) was formed by the local community to oppose the airport expansion.

The annual movement in 2010 were 23,511 and had risen to 23,944 by 2014. However, in February 2014 TAG Farnborough applied for controlled airspace to allow business jets to operate at lower levels as far as the South Downs to allow greater predictability for its clients. Opponents of this proposal state that a far larger number of other flights will then divert into a hazardous bottle-neck to the west, causing a serious risk of collisions, increased noise and increased emissions of carbon dioxide. The closing date for comments on TAG's proposal was extended, after TAG failed to record and acknowledge anything for five days. The Civil Aviation Authority granted the controlled airspace in July 2018, though its implementation was delayed until 2020 by an unsuccessful application by Lasham Gliding Society for a judicial review. By 2018 total annual movements at the airport were 29,958.

Aviation enthusiast scheme 

To promote a closer working relationship with local aviation enthusiasts, Hampshire Police established an Aviation/Airport Watch Scheme.  Originally run by the airport operator, this is now run under the auspices of Project Pegasus.

Membership does not give any additional rights compared to other members of the public, but facilitates frequent contact between the police and enthusiasts.  The scheme has previously arranged visits for members to TAG Farnborough Airport, providing airside access and brief chats with representatives of TAG Aviation. It has also been able to provide viewing areas before, during and after the Farnborough Air Show to members.

References

External links 

 Farnborough Airport Official site
 Farnborough Aerodrome Consultative Committee
 Farnborough Aerodrome Residents Association
 AAIB website
 Farnborough Aviation Group
 Farnborough Spotters
 Farnborough airport news

Transport in Hampshire
Royal Aircraft Establishment stations
Farnborough, Hampshire
Airports in Hampshire
Airports established in 1908
1908 establishments in England